Axel Hornung (born 6 June 1966) is a German tennis coach and former professional player. He has previously served as the national tennis coach of Luxembourg.

Hornung, who comes from Köln, turned professional in 1986 and reached a best singles world ranking of 422.

Ranked as high as 125 in the world for doubles, he had his best year in 1987 when he made five Grand Prix main draw appearances and won an ATP Challenger title in Montabaur.

ATP Challenger titles

Doubles: (1)

References

External links
 
 

1966 births
Living people
West German male tennis players
German tennis coaches
Tennis players from Cologne